The Gnome-Rhône 7K Titan Major was a seven-cylinder 370 hp (270 kW) air-cooled radial engine, that started life as an enlarged Gnome-Rhône 5K with two extra cylinders.

Development
The Gnome-Rhône 5K was itself a licensed version of the Bristol Titan.  The 7K is very comparable to the Bristol Neptune seven-cylinder engine since they used the same technology. The 7K was followed by the larger and more powerful nine-cylinder 550 hp (405 kW) Gnome-Rhône 9K Mistral.  Gnome-Rhône later responded to the need for a more powerful engine by developing the 7K into a two-row version that became the Gnome-Rhône14K Mistral Major.

Variants
IAM K7Licence production in Yugoslavia by Industrija Aeroplanskih Motora- Rakovica (IAM).
IAR 7KLicence production in Romania by Industria Aeronautică Română (IAR).

Applications

Specifications (7Kd)

See also

References

Notes

Bibliography

 Gunston, Bill. World Encyclopedia of Aero Engines. Cambridge, England. Patrick Stephens Limited, 1989. 

1920s aircraft piston engines
Aircraft air-cooled radial piston engines
7K